John Whitson (c. 1558 – 1629) was an English merchant and politician who sat in the House of Commons at various times between 1605 and 1626. He also founded Redmaids School for girls. Later it became Redmaids High School for Girls when it joined Redland high a school founded by nuns in the 19th century. It also had a junior school founded.

Life
Whitson grew up in Clearwell in the Forest of Dean, and came to Bristol to start his career. Apprenticed to Nicholas Cutt, a member of the Society of Merchant Venturers in 1570, he lived in a house on Corn Street. Cutt died in 1582, and it is presumed Whitson continued to work for his widow, Bridget, whom he married in 1585.  They had their first child 8 months later. Following the wedding, John Whitson became a wealthy merchant in his own right.

Whitson was a merchant and alderman of Bristol. He was Sheriff  in 1589 and became Lord Mayor of Bristol for the first time in 1603. Whitson had shares in two ships, the Maryflower and the Seabrake (which would later give their names to houses at The Red Maids' School), that brought home enemy prizes in the 1590s.  Whitson decided that the prize cargo had belonged to poor sailors attempting to supplement their income with extra trade, so rather than stealing from the poor, he sold his share of the prize and gave the money to the almshouses of Bristol. In 1605, he was elected Member of Parliament for Bristol in a by-election to replace Sir George Snigge who was raised to the Bench.

During this time, Whitson also helped to re-establish and govern the Society of Merchant Venturers which had become moribund in the later sixteenth century. Whitson’s first wife died in 1608 and he remarried within the year to Magdalen Hynde, the widow of a London merchant, William Hynde. He was re-elected MP for Bristol in 1614 and he was Mayor of Bristol in 1616. Whitson married his third wife (and third widow), Rachel Aubrey, in 1617, she outlived him. In 1621 he was re-elected MP for Bristol. He was elected MP for Bristol again in 1625 and 1626. In 1627 he gave a charity of £500 to be divided between five young men being "meer merchants", and an unspecified number of handicraft tradesmen and freemen of Bristol. 
 
Whitson was hurt by a fall from his horse, his head hitting an upturned nail by a Blacksmiths, which was the supposed cause of his death at the age of 71. He was buried at St Nicholas' Church on 9 March 1629 and, as he was Captain of the trained bands of the city, they attended his body to the church and the musketeers fired three volleys over his grave. His monument in St Nicholas described him as "a worthy pattern to all who came after him".

Whitson’s will gave specific instructions for provision for "one woman … and forty poor women children" who were to be taught English and sew, to attend church, and were bound to their teacher for eight years. Each child was to "go appareled in red cloth", as per the boys educated at the Queen Elizabeth's Hospital school, thus founding The Red Maids' School as the oldest girls’ school in the country.

Archives
Archival material relating to John Whitson's charities, including minute books, account books and records of the Red Maids School, are held by Bristol Archives (Ref. 33041/BMC/6) (online catalogue).

References

1550s births
1629 deaths
High Sheriffs of Bristol
English merchants
Year of birth uncertain
Mayors of Bristol
Members of the Parliament of England for Bristol
17th-century merchants
English MPs 1604–1611
English MPs 1614
English MPs 1621–1622
English MPs 1625
English MPs 1626
Deaths by horse-riding accident in England
People from Forest of Dean District
Members of the Society of Merchant Venturers
Businesspeople from Bristol